Tony Peter Clement  (born January 27, 1961) is a Canadian former federal politician and former Member of Parliament for Parry Sound—Muskoka in Ontario. Before entering federal politics, Clement served as an Ontario cabinet minister, including as Minister of Health and Long-Term Care under premiers Mike Harris and Ernie Eves.

Moving to federal politics, he was a candidate for the leadership of the Conservative Party of Canada after its formation from the merger of the Progressive Conservative and Canadian Alliance parties in 2003. He lost to Stephen Harper. Clement won the seat of Parry Sound—Muskoka in the 2006 federal election, defeating incumbent Liberal cabinet minister Andy Mitchell. The Conservatives formed government in that election and Clement was appointed Minister of Health and Minister for FedNor. He also later served as President of the Treasury Board. Clement was re-elected despite the Conservative defeat in the 2015 election. On July 12, 2016, he announced his second bid for the leadership of the Conservative Party but withdrew on October 13, 2016.

From his initial election in 2006, Clement sat as a Conservative member until he resigned at the request of Conservative leader Andrew Scheer on November 7, 2018 due to a sexting scandal.

Early life and career

Clement was born Tony Peter Panayi in Manchester, England, the son of Carol Ann (née Drapkin) and Peter Panayi. His father was a Greek Cypriot and his mother was Jewish (part of her family had immigrated from Aleppo, Syria). He emigrated to Canada in childhood with his parents when he was four years old. His parents divorced and his mother married Ontario politician John Clement, with Tony adopting his stepfather's surname soon after.

As a student at the University of Toronto, Clement was elected twice, both as an undergraduate and as a law student, to the university's Governing Council. He was also president of the campus Progressive Conservatives. He first attracted the attention of the media in 1986, when he created a new society to invite the South African ambassador to Canada, Glenn Babb, to speak after the International Law Society had withdrawn its invitation, deeming it too controversial because of the issue of apartheid. Clement argued in favour of inviting Babb on the grounds of free speech. An attempt by four law professors for a court injunction barring "any representative of the Republic of South Africa to expound, explain or otherwise to solicit public support for his Government's policy of apartheid" was rejected by the court.

A graduate of the University of Toronto, Clement completed degrees in political science in 1983 and law in 1986. He was called to the Ontario Bar in 1988.

Clement is married to Lynne Golding, a partner and Chair of the Health Law Practice at the international law firm, Fasken Martineau DuMoulin.

Clement became president of the Progressive Conservative Party of Ontario in 1990 and was a close ally of then-party leader Mike Harris.  He ran, unsuccessfully, for Metro Toronto Council in 1994, losing to future mayor David Miller in the ward of Parkdale-High Park. He served as Harris's assistant principal secretary from 1992 to 1995 and played a leading role in drafting policy directives for the Common Sense Revolution.

In November 2019, Clement started the "And Another Thing" podcast with Jodie Jenkins which features a weekly interview with a public figure, and the discussion between Clement and Jenkins.

In provincial politics
Clement was elected to the Legislative Assembly of Ontario in the provincial election of 1995, defeating incumbent Liberal Bob Callahan by over 6,000 votes in the riding of Brampton South. After serving as a Parliamentary Assistant for two years, he was appointed Minister of Transportation on October 10, 1997. He also represented the Progressive Conservative government on a variety of televised discussion panels, gaining the reputation of a rising star in the party.

Clement was returned in the provincial election of 1999 in the new riding of Brampton West—Mississauga, defeating Liberal candidate Vic Dhillon by over 8,000 votes. He was promoted to Minister of the Environment on June 17, 1999, and served in this capacity until May 3, 2000. In this role, he implemented the program known as Ontario's Drive Clean, which mandated periodic emissions tests on vehicles in southern Ontario.

Clement was appointed Minister of Municipal Affairs and Housing on October 25, 1999, and held this position until February 8, 2001.

On February 8, 2001, Clement was appointed Minister of Health and Long-Term Care. He initiated primary care reform, oversaw the implementation of Telehealth Ontario (a toll-free health information line staffed by registered nurses) and expanded Ontario's hospitals system. Clement also entered into a public-private partnership for a hospital redevelopment in Brampton.

Clement ran for leadership in the 2002 Ontario Progressive Conservative Party leadership election and finished third on the first ballot. Clement then placed his support behind victorious candidate Ernie Eves on the second ballot. When Eves became Premier, he kept Clement in the Health portfolio.

Clement was especially prominent when Toronto suffered an outbreak of SARS in the summer of 2003, travelling to Geneva in a successful bid to urge the World Health Organization to lift a travel ban to Canada's largest city.

The Eves government was defeated in the 2003 provincial election, and Clement was defeated by Vic Dhillon by about 2,500 votes in a rematch of 1999. Clement afterwards worked as a counsel for Bennett Jones LLP. He also was a small business owner and a visiting professor at the University of Toronto Faculty of Law.

Federal politics
Clement first became prominent in federal politics in 2000, sitting on the steering committee for the United Alternative. This initiative was meant to provide a framework for the Reform Party and Progressive Conservative Party to unite under a single banner. It did not accomplish this end, but nonetheless led to the formation of the Canadian Alliance later that year; Clement served as the Alliance's founding president.

Soon after the 2003 provincial election, Clement declared himself a candidate for the leadership of the new Conservative Party of Canada. He placed third in the party's leadership vote, while Stephen Harper emerged as the winner.

He then sought election as the Conservative Party candidate in Brampton West in the 2004 federal election, but lost to Liberal incumbent Colleen Beaumier by about 3,500 votes.

For his second attempt to win a seat in the House of Commons of Canada, in the 2006 campaign, he switched to the Parry Sound—Muskoka riding.  On election night, he was declared winner by 21 votes.  Upon conclusion of the judicial recount, Clement was found to have defeated Mitchell by 28 votes: 18,513-18,485. On February 6, 2006, Clement was appointed as Minister of Health by Prime Minister Stephen Harper.

Clement pledged to extend an existing measure to require disclosure of meetings by only registered lobbyists with lower-level government officials who have decision-making power.

Minister of Health
Some of Clement's initiatives included announcing a national strategy on autism, working towards establishing Canada's first Patient Wait Times Guarantees, and investing in faster, more effective and safer health information systems across Canada for Canadians.

One of Clement's first initiatives as Minister of Health was establishing the Canadian Partnership Against Cancer, an independent not-for-profit organization committed to combating this disease and improve patient quality of life.

In 2006, Clement launched the Public Health Scholarship and Capacity Building Initiative — on-going scholarships supporting public health training and positions across Canada.  Furthermore, in 2006, he announced the $1-billion compensation package for pre-1986/post-1990 forgotten victims of the tainted blood scandal, who were neglected in the 1998 settlement agreement.

Clement also played a key role in launching the Chemical Management Plan, which the Conservative government claimed "made Canada a world leader in chemical management".  "We have established clear priorities and now we are taking action to protect the health of Canadians," said Clement.  Further, the government claimed "Canada was the first nation in the world to take action to prohibit the importation, sale and advertising of baby bottles that contain BPA".

On September 29, 2007, the CBC reported Clement's new strategy to combat the growing drug abuse problem in Canada.  "The party is over" for illicit drug users, he announced, with the new policy aiming towards widespread arrest of drug users, in contrast to the old strategy of targeting dealers.  Over 130 physicians and scientists signed a petition condemning the Conservative government's "potentially deadly" misrepresentation of the positive evidence for harm reduction programs. Clement stated that governments in Canada have been sending the wrong message about drug use, and he wanted to clear up the mixed messages going out on illicit drugs.

Also in 2007, Clement launched the new Canada's Food Guide, the first update in 15 years incorporating the most up-to-date information based on current nutritional science and a new interactive web section.

Minister of Industry

On October 30, 2008, Clement was sworn into the office of Industry Minister. This included the appointment to the Office of the Registrar General of Canada.

Shortly after becoming Industry Minister, Clement launched the Knowledge Infrastructure Program, a two-year $2-billion measure that supported infrastructure enhancement at post-secondary institutions across Canada.

In conjunction with the US and Ontario governments, Clement worked closely on the restructuring of GM and Chrysler.  Following the successful restructuring, he stated that the companies "will now be in a position to operate a sustainable and viable business that Lost 86% production, innovation and jobs in Canada."  Furthermore, he said, "This is news for 32,000 Canadian auto workers, the Canadian auto parts supply chain and for Canadian consumers.  Moving forward, the Government of Canada will continue to work toward removing our country's auto industry, while exercising rigorous oversight of taxpayer money."

In the summer of 2010, Clement introduced changes to the 2011 Census. On this issue, he said, "The government will retain the mandatory short form that will collect basic demographic information.  To meet the need for additional information, and to respect the privacy wishes of Canadians, the government has introduced the voluntary National Household Survey (NHS)." The change sparked significant criticism, including the resignation of Statistics Canada's Chief Statistician (see Voluntary long-form survey controversy). Other changes included the addition of questions about the languages spoken by Canadians.

On November 14, 2010, Australia's BHP Billiton withdrew its hostile $39-billion offer for Saskatchewan's Potash Corporation.  At a news conference following the withdrawal, Clement explained that of the six Investment Canada Act guidelines that determine if an investment has a "net benefit", he said BHP's bid failed to meet three of them. Clement said the Government felt the takeover would not have a beneficial effect on Canada's competitiveness in world markets.

In January 2011, Clement spoke out against a ruling of the Canadian Radio-television and Telecommunications Commission (CRTC) which allowed usage-based billing for wholesale clients and smaller internet service providers. Citing concerns about how the change could adversely affect consumers, small businesses and entrepreneurs, he warned that if they did not revise the decision, the government would intervene. The CRTC initiated its own review of the ruling, and reversed its decision.

In the lead-up to the 2010 G8 summit, Clement was involved in directing $50 million of border security money for largely unrelated projects in his own riding, a practice commonly known as "pork barrelling". Auditor-General Sheila Fraser issued a report criticizing the Minister for breaking the rules and "complained that there was no paperwork to determine how the hundreds of proposals" for spending were narrowed to the 32 projects that were approved. Clement later admitted that this process was not subject to the oversight that it should have been.

President of the Treasury Board

Shortly after the May 2, 2011 election, Clement was appointed as the President of the Treasury Board, a position of wide-ranging authority and oversight. Consistent with the Conservative Party of Canada's election platform, Clement has been tasked with leading a government-wide spending review, with the goal of finding ways to contain government spending.

On November 2, 2013, Clement backed a motion at the Conservative Party national convention that advocated clawing back public-sector pay and benefits. At the convention he vowed, as the minister responsible for negotiations with the civil service, to "alter the dynamics of collective bargaining as it has been done in this country over the last few decades".

On December 22, 2014, Clement was quoted by the Canadian Press as saying that government deliberately withholds public data because people using the information might "create havoc" by altering the contents.

Minister responsible for the Federal Economic Development Initiative for Northern Ontario
On February 6, 2006, in addition to being appointed Minister of Health, Clement was also appointed Minister responsible for FedNor (Federal Economic Development Initiative for Northern Ontario).  Clement held the FedNor portfolio until July 2013.  FedNor invests in projects that support community economic development, business growth and competitiveness, and innovation; FedNor's goal is to encourage economic growth, diversification, job creation and self-reliant communities in northern Ontario.

Between February 2006 and January 2012, FedNor approved $398 million in support of 1,742 projects, which leveraged an additional $614 million from other sources.  During this same period, FedNor also approved $11 million towards 364 youth internships, with close to two-thirds of these interns finding employment following their internship.  Of the total funding from February 2006 to January 2012, $44 million went toward 300 tourism-related projects, which included over 70 youth internships.

FedNor projects include some of the following:

Red Lake	- Unorganized Kenora District	- To build on existing efforts to extend Union Gas' natural gas pipeline to the Goldcorp mines, businesses, and residences of the Red Lake community.  $2.7 million

Dryden     - The Corporation of The City of Dryden     - To expand Dryden's industrial park and the Norwill subdivision (acquisition and clearing of land, construction of an access road, and expansion of municipal services).	$1,470,000

Eagle Lake     - Eagle Lake First Nation     - To prepare the First Nation for the development of one of two proposed wood processing plants for the Two Feathers Forest Products Initiative.	Project cancelled on January 27, 2011

Parry Sound	- The Corporation of the Town of Parry Sound	- To expand municipal services to accommodate the announced $6.2-million construction of an expanded Parry Sound Canadore College campus.	$1,290,000

FedNor has provided funding to encourage tourism in northern Ontario by:
Increasing the awareness of this region as a tourism destination;
Encouraging product development and investments in northern Ontario's tourism assets and products by supporting new and expanding festivals and events, and developing niche tourism products (e.g., authentic Aboriginal, francophone, motorcycling touring routes);
Fostering an adequate supply of skills and labour to enhance visitor experiences.

Opposition
Clement retained his seat in the 2015 general election that defeated the Conservative government. Moving to the Opposition benches, he was appointed the Opposition's critic for foreign affairs by interim Leader of the Opposition Rona Ambrose. He stepped down from the Shadow Cabinet on July 12, 2016 in order to launch his campaign for the leadership of the Conservative Party. He ended his campaign on October 12, 2016, due to not meeting fundraising goals he had set for his campaign.

Sexting scandal
In early November 2018, Clement resigned his House of Commons committee assignments and his role as Conservative Shadow Minister for Justice. The resignation was filed after he admitted having shared "sexually explicit images and a video of [himself]" with an individual or party that he "believed was a consenting female recipient" but was actually a person that Clement claimed had targeted him for extortion. The RCMP were investigating the situation. After additional allegations of improper behaviour were made against Clement on November 7, party leader Andrew Scheer requested that he also resign from the Conservative caucus. Clement did so and continued to sit as an independent MP. In January 2019, two men from the Ivory Coast were arrested in connection with the attempted extortion of Clement. On April 2, Clement announced that he would not be standing as a candidate in the next federal election.

Political positions

Clement has stated that there are circumstances where the death penalty is warranted.

Clement, as Conservative Public Safety Critic, stated in February 2017 that the RCMP needed to "enforce the law" to stop the influx of Syrian Refugees attempting to cross the Canada–United States border in the wake of US President Donald Trump's Executive Order 13769 to ban citizens of certain majority Muslim countries from entering the United States. When a CBC Radio reporter asked Clement in a telephone interview to specify the measures the RCMP must take to do so, he refused to answer and hung up. Clement stated in an interview with Power Play on CTV News Channel that the Conservatives "are calling for two things in particular. One, more resources, more money and funding, and human resources for the border agents and for the RCMP to deal with this much higher influx... Secondly, we want the federal government to develop a plan. What is the plan that is going to be employed or deployed to ensure that the rule of law continues in this country, that the laws are obeyed, that we don't have illegal crossings?"

Clement favored reforming Canada's taxation system. When running for the Conservative Party leadership he collaborated with Roger Martin on a proposal for a lifetime income tax.

Electoral record

Federal

Provincial

Municipal

References

External links
 
 
 
 Archival holdings
 Tony Clement fonds held at the University of Toronto Archives and Records Management Services, related to his time at University College
 Tony Clement fonds held at the Archives of Ontario, related to his time at Progressive Conservative Party of Ontario presidency
 Region of Peel Archives, related to his time as Member of Provincial Parliament

1961 births
Canadian adoptees
Canadian Ministers of Health
Canadian people of Greek Cypriot descent
Canadian people of Syrian-Jewish descent
Canadian Christians
Conservative Party of Canada MPs
English emigrants to Canada
Health ministers of Ontario
Jewish Canadian politicians
Lawyers in Ontario
Living people
Members of the 28th Canadian Ministry
Members of the Executive Council of Ontario
Members of the House of Commons of Canada from Ontario
Members of the King's Privy Council for Canada
Politicians from Brampton
Politicians from Manchester
Presidents of the Progressive Conservative Party of Ontario
Progressive Conservative Party of Ontario MPPs
University of Toronto alumni
University of Toronto Faculty of Law alumni
Independent MPs in the Canadian House of Commons
Canadian politicians of Syrian descent
Political sex scandals in Canada